"Willst du mit mir gehn" (German for "Do You Want to Go with Me") is a song by German recording artist Nena. It was co-written and produced along by Uwe Fahrenkrog-Petersen for her same-titled thirteenth studio album (2005). Released as the album's second single, the dance pop song reached the top ten of the German Singles Chart.

Formats and track listings

Charts

References

External links
"Willst du mit mir gehn" at the official Nena website

2005 singles
2005 songs
Nena songs
Songs written by Jörn-Uwe Fahrenkrog-Petersen
Warner Records singles